The following is a list of football stadiums in Finland, ordered by capacity.

See also
List of stadiums in the Nordic countries by capacity
List of European stadiums by capacity
List of association football stadiums by capacity

Finland
Football stadiumsi
Stadiums